Photo editing can refer to:

Image editing techniques applied to photographs
Photo manipulation, the use of image editing to create an illusion or deception

See also
Image processing